is a Japanese racing driver.

Career
Kanamaru's single seater career began in 2012 after graduating from karting. He took a surprise win in the Formula Renault 2.0 NEC in 2012 at the final race of the season at Spa-Francorchamps. He made his Formula Renault 3.5 debut in 2015 for Pons Racing replacing Meindert van Buuren.

Racing record

Career summary

Complete World Series Formula V8 3.5 results
(key) (Races in bold indicate pole position) (Races in italics indicate fastest lap)

Complete WeatherTech SportsCar Championship results 
(key) (Races in bold indicate pole position; races in italics indicate fastest lap)

References

External links
 
 

1994 births
Living people
Sportspeople from Tokyo
Japanese racing drivers
Karting World Championship drivers
Formula Renault 2.0 NEC drivers
Formula Renault Eurocup drivers
Euroformula Open Championship drivers
World Series Formula V8 3.5 drivers
F3 Asian Championship drivers
Formula Regional Japanese Championship drivers

Japanese Formula 3 Championship drivers
KTR drivers
Teo Martín Motorsport drivers
Carlin racing drivers
Pons Racing drivers
RP Motorsport drivers
De Villota Motorsport drivers
21st-century Japanese people
BlackArts Racing drivers
WeatherTech SportsCar Championship drivers
B-Max Racing drivers